German submarine U-136 was a Type VIIC U-boat of Nazi Germany's Kriegsmarine during World War II.

She was laid down at Vulkan-Vegesackerwerft in Bremen on 2 October 1940 as yard number 15, launched on 5 July 1941 and commissioned on 30 August with Kapitänleutnant Heinrich Zimmermann in command.

Her service career began with the commencement of crew training with the 6th U-boat Flotilla on her commissioning date. She became operational on 1 January 1942, also with the 6th flotilla.

Design
German Type VIIC submarines were preceded by the shorter Type VIIB submarines. U-136 had a displacement of  when at the surface and  while submerged. She had two shafts and two  propellers.

U-136 was fitted with five  torpedo tubes (four fitted at the bow and one at the stern), fourteen torpedoes, one  SK C/35 naval gun, 220 rounds, and an anti-aircraft gun. The boat had a complement of between forty-four and sixty.

Service history

First patrol
Her first patrol was unusual in that it was divided into three parts. Part one saw the boat depart Kiel on 22 January 1942 and arrive at Kristiansand in Norway on the 24th. Part two was from Kristiansand to Bergen, also in Norway. Part three involved the boat crossing the North Sea and negotiating the passage between the Faroe and Shetland Islands into the Atlantic Ocean. She also sank  on the 17th. She then sailed to St. Nazaire in occupied France, arriving on 1 March.

Second patrol
All the crew survived; one of them, the third engineer, was found floating with a part of the ship's cargo tucked under each arm - it was TNT.

Third patrol and loss
The boat's third and last patrol began with her departure from St. Nazaire on 29 June 1942.

Wolfpacks
U-136 took part in two wolfpacks, namely:
 Schlei (1 – 12 February 1942)
 Hai (3 – 11 July 1942)

Summary of raiding history

References

Notes

Citations

Bibliography

External links

German Type VIIC submarines
U-boats commissioned in 1941
U-boats sunk in 1942
World War II submarines of Germany
1941 ships
World War II shipwrecks in the Atlantic Ocean
Ships built in Bremen (state)
U-boats sunk by depth charges
U-boats sunk by British warships
U-boats sunk by French warships
Ships lost with all hands
Maritime incidents in July 1942